Joseph Chebet (born 23 August 1970) is the winner of the 1999 Boston Marathon and the 1999 New York Marathon. He won in Boston in 1999 after losing to fellow Kenyan Moses Tanui the year before by only three seconds.

Achievements
All results regarding marathon, unless stated otherwise

Other Notable Performances

Chebet won the Amsterdam Marathon in 1996
Chebet won the Torino Marathon in 1997.
His best marathon time was his 2nd place loss to Tanui when he ran 2:07:37 at Boston in 1998.
1998 was a tough year for Chebet. He lost not only the Boston Marathon by three seconds, but also lost the New York Marathon by three seconds to John Kagwe.

See also
 List of winners of the Boston Marathon
 List of winners of the New York City Marathon

External links

New York Marathon

Kenyan male long-distance runners
1970 births
Living people
New York City Marathon male winners
Boston Marathon male winners